Marco Polo, if You Can is a 1982 Blackford Oakes novel by William F. Buckley, Jr. It is the fourth of 11 novels in the series.

Plot
CIA agent Blackford Oakes is shot down in a U-2 spy plane over the Soviet Union in 1960.

References

1982 American novels
Blackford Oakes novels
Fiction set in 1960
Novels set in Russia
Doubleday (publisher) books